Lu Dachang (1889–1962) courtesy name Songling was a Kuomintang general from Gansu. In 1911 he was in Shaanxi province. He went to Hunan province in 1915, where he was promoted to company commander. Returned to Gansu in 1921. Promoted in 1922 to commander of the Infantry 3rd Battalion of the 1st Regiment. In the spring of 1926, the Zhili clique attacked the Northwest Army defending Dingxi. Promoted in 1927 to commander of the regiment. In 1931, he was promoted to commander of the 14th Division of the National Revolutionary Army, in charge of Min County, Longxi County, Wen County, Wushan County, Xihe County, Li County and Gangu County.

Chinese Civil War
In September 1935, Lu fought the forces of the Chinese Red Army led by Lin Biao and Nie Rongzhen in Gannan. On August 25, 1937, he executed the son and daughter-in-law of Tibetan Tusi Yang Jiqing.

References
Generals of World War II - http://www.generals.dk/general/Lu_Dachang/_/China.html

1889 births
1962 deaths
People from Linxia
Republic of China warlords from Gansu
National Revolutionary Army generals from Gansu